Alstonia iwahigensis is a tree in the dogbane family Apocynaceae.

Description
The bark is greyish, yellowish or dark brown. Its fragrant flowers feature a yellow or pinkish corolla.

Distribution and habitat
Alstonia iwahigensis is native to Borneo and Palawan. The species is found in forests and on hillsides from sea level to  altitude.

References

iwahigensis
Trees of Borneo
Trees of the Philippines
Plants described in 1912